Kameeiamoku (died 1802) was a Hawaiian high chief and the Counselor of State to King Kamehameha I. He was called Kamehameha's uncle, but he was really the cousin of Kamehameha's mother, Kekuiapoiwa II.

Birth and ancestry 
Along with his twin brother Kamanawa, Kameeiamoku's parents were the keiki aliʻi (prince or child of a chief), Keawepoepoe and Kanoena (w). As the son of Kalanikauleleiaiwi and Lonoikahaupu, monarch's of several kingdoms between them, Keawepoepoe was an aliʻi (noble) of Hawaii, Maui, Oahu and Kauai.  As well being an aliʻi nui (great king or supreme monarch) Lonoikahaupu was a kahuna (priest) of the order of Lono (order of Nahulu or Holoa'e), one of two priestly orders, Kū (Kuali'i or Kauali'i) being the other. Through this union Keawepoepoe received the kapu o pahenakalani (the prostrating kapu) which is how the Hawaii aliʻi received the kapu (a religious code of conduct) called the kapu moe.

Fornander identifies their mother, Kanoena, as the daughter of Lonoanahulu from the Ehu ohana (family). Almira Hollander Pitman refers to Kanoena in 1931 as Keawepoepoe's cousin. However, in the Hawaiian Genealogy book volume 44: "Eia ka lani ke koi pae moku ka lauhulu paoki o ka aina", it shows Lonoanahulu marrying Hikuakanaloauuoo and having Manohili who marries Halao, which is the couple that has Kanoena. That would make Lonoanahulua Kanoena's grandfather. Kamakau lists Mano-hili as one of the men who assisted Kameʻeiamoku in his attack on the Fair American. Fornander also refers to Lonoanahulu, along with the Kameʻeiamoku and Kamanawa in regards to lands passed down to them from Liloa;

The Metcalfes, the Eleanora and the Fair American 
In 1790, the American maritime fur trader Simon Metcalfe of the ship Eleanora mistreated Kameeiamoku when he boarded his ship. Metcalfe later fired his cannons on the villagers of Olowalu, killing about one hundred. In retaliation, Kameeiamoku attacked the next American ship to appear, the schooner , under the command of Thomas Humphrey Metcalfe, the son of Simon Metcalfe. All but one of the schooner's crew was killed, including Thomas Humphrey Metcalfe. The lone survivor was Welsh sailor Isaac Davis. Another sailor from the Eleanora, Englishman John Young, was sent ashore to find out what happened, and was also captured. Davis and Young would both become military advisors and translators for Kamehameha.

Kameeiamoku participated in negotiating a treaty in February 1795 with George Vancouver for British support of Kamehameha.

Kamehameha and the unification of the islands
Kameʻeiamoku and his twin Kamanawa were among the four great aliʻi warriors of Kona to support Kamehameha I in his rebellion against his cousin Kīwalaʻō; the other two being their half brother Keʻeaumoku Pāpaʻiahiahi, and Keawe-a-Heulu. These were known as the "Four Kona chiefs". They, along with Kamehameha's kumu (teacher) of Kapu Kuialua named Kekūhaupiʻo, were the center of the war council for Kamehameha when he took power in the battle of Mokuōhai in 1782, which strengthened his influence.

Family
Kameeiamoku had three or four wives and at least three sons. His first wife, Kamakaeheikuli, was the mother of Kepookalani (c. 1760–?) who was the double great-grandfather of the last two monarchs of the Kingdom. His second wife Kealiiokahekili was the mother of Ulumāheihei Hoapili (c. 1776–1840). His third wife Kahikoloa was mother of Hoolulu (1794–?). Kameeiamoku's descendants succeeded him in assisting Kamehameha after his death in 1802 in Lahaina on Maui.

Legacy
Through his son Kepookalani came the House of Kalākaua. One of his other sons Hoolulu would be the father of Kinoole o Liliha who married the notable American businessman Benjamin Pitman. Daughter Kekikipaa would marry Kamehameha I, but then marry Keawemauhili and become the mother of High Chiefess Kapiolani.

He lives on the coat of arms of the Kingdom of Hawaii. On each side of the coat of arms was the figure of a chief in a feather cloak and a feather helmet. The one on the left, bearing a spear, was Kamanawa and the one on the right, with a Kahili (feather standard), was Kameeiamoku.
The land he was given in 1795 was used by his granddaughter Kuini Liliha, who donated it to Christian missionaries. It eventually became Punahou School in 1841.

Ancestry

References

Bibliography

Royalty of the Hawaiian Kingdom
Hawaii (island)
Hawaiian Kingdom politicians
House of Kalākaua
House of Keawe
Hawaiian Kingdom twins
18th-century births
1802 deaths